Soavina is a town and commune in Madagascar. It belongs to the district of Betafo, which is a part of Vakinankaratra Region. The population of the commune was estimated to be approximately 20,000 in 2001 commune census.

Primary and junior level secondary education are available in town. The majority 75% of the population of the commune are farmers, while an additional 25% receives their livelihood from raising livestock. The most important crops are rice and bambara groundnut, while other important agricultural products are maize and cassava.

References and notes 

Populated places in Vakinankaratra